Meridian Mansions, also known as The Envoy, is a historic structure located in the Adams Morgan neighborhood in the Northwest Quadrant of Washington, D.C.  A.H. Sonnemann was the architect for what was considered the city's finest apartment hotel when it opened in 1918.  The building has been home to members of Congress and diplomats over the years.  The lobby contains marble columns and elaborate ornamental molding.  At one time the building featured roof pavilions and lamp standards, which were removed around 1963. It was renovated in 1981 and it was listed on the National Register of Historic Places in 1983. The building is most notable due to its connection to the establishment of Czechoslovakia as an independent nation. Tomáš Garrigue Masaryk, the founder and first President of Czechoslovakia, resided here between July and November 1918. The first Czechoslovakian national flag to be created was flown from the building on October 18, 1918.

References

Czech-American culture in Washington, D.C.
Slovak-American history
Residential buildings completed in 1918
Apartment buildings in Washington, D.C.
Italianate architecture in Washington, D.C.
Residential buildings on the National Register of Historic Places in Washington, D.C.
Adams Morgan